The FK Sarajevo Youth School, is the youth department for Bosnian football club FK Sarajevo and is considered to be the best in the country.

The department is split into two sections. Namely, The Asim Ferhatović Hase School of Football, named after legendary striker Asim Ferhatović, and the FK Sarajevo Academy. The former functions as both a general model for the popularization of the sport and as a filtering mechanism, used to pick out locally based footballing talents which are later transferred to the academy. The academy, in turn, is a top-of-the-line boarding school which brings in the biggest talents from Bosnia and Herzegovina and organizes the competitive youth selections for the club. The Youth school has teams for the Under-8 through to the Under-16 age groups, while the academy is split into the U-15 (younger cadets), U-17 (older cadets) and U-19 (junior) selections.

The department was founded in the 1950s and has been historically known as one of the best youth systems in the former Yugoslavia. Its training philosophy is not only the development of football players, but also the care for the players' growth, education and character formation, while teaching the sporting spirit and loyalty to the club. The youth teams, besides national competitions, participate in numerous tournaments around Europe, testing their skills against some of the best European clubs. Tournaments the club's youth selection traditionally take part in include Kvarnerska Rivijera, Trofeo Dossena, Generali CEE Cup and the Karol Wojtyla Cup.

FK Sarajevo's youth selections train in two venues. Namely, the Asim Ferhatović Hase Sports Complex and the elite Butmir Training Centre, which is currently under expansion as of February 2015. Youth team players that don't sign professional contracts with the club are usually transferred to FK Sarajevo's farm team, NK Bosna Visoko. The FK Sarajevo youth system has given numerous Bosnian and Yugoslav internationals throughout the decades.

Youth squad

Youth Academy staff
As of June 2021, the staff includes:

Youth School staff
As of January 2019, the staff includes:

Medical staff

References

External links
Official Website 
FK Sarajevo at Facebook
FK Sarajevo Academy at Facebook
FK Sarajevo at Twitter
FK Sarajevo at UEFA
FKSinfo 

FK Sarajevo
Youth football in Bosnia and Herzegovina
Football academies in Bosnia and Herzegovina